Karma District, Karma Rajоn, Karmianski Rajоn is a district of Gomel Region, in Belarus.

References 

Districts of Gomel Region